Kostas is a 1979 film directed by Paul Cox about a Greek taxi driver.

Production
The film was shot over four weeks in March 1979. $100,000 of the budget came from the Victorian Film Corporation.

Post production on the film was rushed so Cox could ready it in time for the Melbourne Film Festival which he now says was a mistake. However it was the best received of all Cox's features to date.

References

External links

Kostas at Oz Movies

1979 films
Australian romantic drama films
Films directed by Paul Cox
1970s English-language films
1970s Australian films